"I Don't Remember" is a song written and recorded by English rock musician Peter Gabriel, released as the fourth and final single from his third eponymous studio album in 1980. Although originally only released as an A-side single in the United States and Canada, a live version released with the album Plays Live (1983) reached No. 62 on the UK Singles Chart and remained in the Top 75 in Britain for 4 weeks. The song was included in Gabriel's compilation album Shaking the Tree (1990) and two different versions were included in Flotsam and Jetsam (2019).

Background and recording 

Early iterations of the song were performed by Gabriel on the tour to promote his second eponymous studio album (a.k.a. "Scratch", having debuted on the concert on 23 August 1978. 

The basic tracks for first studio recording of "I Don't Remember" were laid down by Gabriel and his backing band at Trident Studios, London during a day off on the "Scratch" tour in Autumn 1978, co-produced by Stephen W. Tayler. A week later, work on the song continued at Atlantic Studios in New York on tour, where overdubs were done including Robert Fripp's guitar, followed by vocals and mixing at Paragon Studios in Chicago. This marked the beginning of work on his third studio album, for which the song would be re-recorded. The early studio version of the song was originally planned to be released as the A-side of the first single from the album in Europe and Japan, however a Charisma Records executive thought the guitar solos were not radio-friendly. This version was later relegated to the B-side of the single "Games Without Frontiers" from Peter Gabriel (3: Melt) in those territories.

The song made pioneering use of the Fairlight CMI, using samples of milk bottles being smashed and bricks being banged for the melody.

Track listing

12" US/Canada single (1980) 

 "I Don't Remember" – 5:56
 "Shosholoza" – 5:19
 "Biko (Remixed Version)" – 8:58
 "Here Comes The Flood" – 4:57

7" US single (1980) 

 "I Don't Remember" – 3:23
 "Shosholoza" – 5:22

7" Canada single (1980) 

 "I Don't Remember" – 3:39
 "Intruder" – 5:00

Live version

7" UK single (1983) 

 "I Don't Remember" – 4:58
 "Solsbury Hill" – 4:43
 "Kiss of Life" – 5:12

12" UK single (1983) 

 "I Don't Remember" – 4:58
 "Solsbury Hill" – 4:43
 "Kiss of Life" – 5:12
 "Games Without Frontiers" – 3:27
 "Family Snapshot" – 4:57

Personnel 

 Peter Gabriel — vocals, piano, synthesizer
 Larry Fast — processing
 David Rhodes – guitar, backing vocals
 Robert Fripp – electric guitar
 Dave Gregory — electric guitar
 Tony Levin – Chapman Stick
 Jerry Marotta — drums

Charts

Cover versions 
 English singer Kate Bush sang the song with Peter Gabriel on May 12, 1979, at a memorial concert at the Hammersmith Odeon for Bill Duffield, a lighting director who died during Bush's 'Tour of Life' tour.
Australian singer Daryl Braithwaite recorded a cover of the song for his 1988 studio album, Edge. His cover samples the drumbeat of "Big Time", another song by Peter Gabriel.
Scottish-American singer and musician David Byrne recorded a cover for Gabriel's 2013 compilation album And I'll Scratch Yours, mixed by Peter Dillett and released on iTunes on 26 June 2010.

References

External links 
 'Peter Gabriel – I Don't Remember' Music Video on YouTube / Directed by Marcello Anciano, produced by Eric Fellner / (C) EMI Music Publishing, 1983
 Lyrics to this song on Genius

Peter Gabriel songs
1980 songs
1980 singles
1983 singles
Songs written by Peter Gabriel
Song recordings produced by Steve Lillywhite
Charisma Records singles
Geffen Records singles
Mercury Records singles
Post-punk songs